The Tutana is a right tributary of the river Argeș in Romania. It flows into the Argeș in Mănicești.

References

Rivers of Romania
Rivers of Argeș County